Siner may refer to:

Places 
Siner, Chuvash Republic, a village in the Chuvash Republic, Russia
Siner, Republic of Tatarstan, a settlement in the Republic of Tatarstan, Russia

People 
Guy Siner (born 1947), English actor
Hosea Siner (1885–1948), American baseball player

See also
Sine (disambiguation)
Sinner (disambiguation)
Signer (disambiguation)
Siné, French political cartoonist
Sinar (disambiguation)
Sinor (disambiguation)